Tentergate is a town in Chris Hani District Municipality in the Eastern Cape province of South Africa.

Tentergate was established in 1976, as a relocation camp for the people who fled Herschel ahead of its incorporation into an independent Transkei.

References

Populated places in the Enoch Mgijima Local Municipality